The 1962 FIFA World Cup CCCF/NAFC–CONMEBOL qualification play-off was a two-legged home-and-away tie between the winners of the CCCF/NAFC final round, Mexico, and a randomly drawn team from the CONMEBOL region, Paraguay. The matches were played on 29 October and 5 November 1961 in Mexico City and Asunción, respectively.

In the first match, Mexico beat Paraguay 1–0 while in the second leg, both teams drew 0–0. Mexico won the series, qualifying for the World Cup.

Teams

Venues

Standings

Matches

First leg

Second leg

References

Play-off Cccf/Nafc-Conmebol
1962
Qual
Mexico national football team matches
Paraguay national football team matches
October 1961 sports events
November 1961 sports events
1962 Fifa World Cup qualification
1962 Fifa World Cup qualification
Sports competitions in Mexico City
Sports competitions in Asunción
International association football competitions hosted by Mexico
International association football competitions hosted by Paraguay